Jaber Ebne Hayyan Pharmaceutical Company engages in manufacture and sale of injection and oral antibiotics, ointments, inhalers, nasal sprays & pearls (soft gel capsules). The company was formerly known as Squibb Iran and changed its name in 1979. Jaber Ebne Hayyan Pharmaceutical Company was founded in 1960 and is based in Tehran, Iran. The company is public joint stock and member of Tehran Stock Exchange with the registered capital of 378,000,000,000 rials.

Products
 Ampicillin 250 mg, 500 mg & 1 g vial
 Cefazolin 250 mg, 500 mg & 1 g vial
 Cefotaxime 500 mg & 1 g vial
 Ceftriaxone 500 mg, 1 g & 2 g vial
 Vancomycin 500 mg & 1 g vial
 Nystatin 100000 U vag tab
 Cefixime 200 mg & 400 mg tab
 Cefalexin 250 mg & 500 mg cap
 Ibuprofen 200 mg & 400 mg pearl
 Salbutamol 100 mcg/doseE HFA inhaler
 Fluticasone 125 & 250 mcg/dose HFA inhaler
 Cromolyn 2% 13 mL nasal spray
 Calcitonin 100 & 200 IU/dose nasal spray

See also
Iranian pharmaceutical industry

References
 Comprehensive DataBase Of All Listed Companies (Jaber Ebne Hayyan Pharma)
 Bloomberg BusinessWeek
 Iran pharmaceutical drug statistics (annual report)
 Iran Food and Drug Organization

External links
 Jaber Ebne Hayyan Pharmaceutical Company - Tehran Stock Exchange
 Official site

Companies listed on the Tehran Stock Exchange
Pharmaceutical companies of Iran
Pharmaceutical companies established in 1960